The Derwitzer Glider was a glider that was developed by Otto Lilienthal, so named because it was tested near Derwitz in Brandenburg. When flown in 1891, it became a very early successful design able to carry a person and the one of the first successful manned aircraft in the world. He made flights of up to 25 metres (80 feet) in it.


Specifications

References
 Otto Lilienthal Museum website
 Centennial of Flight website

19th-century German experimental aircraft
Lilienthal aircraft
Glider aircraft
Aircraft first flown in 1891
1891 in Germany
1891 in science
Monoplanes